Felix Vincent Kelly (26 September 1866 – 31 January 1945) was a New Zealand cricketer. He played eight first-class matches for Auckland between 1889 and 1898.

Felix Kelly was a bowler. He took his best figures of 5 for 30 in his last first-class match, against Hawke's Bay in 1897–98. In a senior club match in Auckland in 1896 he took 9 for 29 in an innings and caught the other batsman.

Kelly was also one of the best rifle shooters in the Auckland area. He worked as a civil engineer and surveyor. 

He and his wife Hortense (née Runcie) had two sons. He died in Wellington after a short illness.

See also
 List of Auckland representative cricketers

References

External links
 
 Felix Kelly at CricketArchive

1866 births
1945 deaths
New Zealand cricketers
Auckland cricketers